Chencang District , is a district of the city of Baoji, Shaanxi province, China.

Chencang is the former name of Baoji, which was given to the district. The district makes up the outer areas of Baoji, most of the area being rural. In 2020, the Baoji High-tech Zone was established in the district.

After the founding of the People's Republic of China, it came under the jurisdiction of the Baoji region and was called Baoji County. In October 1971, Baoji District was abolished and Baoji prefecture level city was established, to which Baoji County belonged. In March 2003, the State Council approved the abolition of Baoji County and the establishment of Chencang District in Baoji City.

The county seat of Guozhen has carried the same name for 3,000 years. Many archeological sites are located in Chencang. The Guoji Zibai pan was excavated in the county, it is now displayed in the National Museum of China. Chencang also has its own museum to display local archeological finds.

Administrative divisions
As 2020, this County is divided to 3 subdistricts and 15 towns.
Subdistricts
Guozhen Subdistrict
Dongguan Subdistrict
Qianwei Subdistrict

Towns

Climate

References

External links

Districts of Shaanxi
Baoji